Čistá is a municipality and village in Mladá Boleslav District in the Central Bohemian Region of the Czech Republic. It has about 800 inhabitants.

Etymology
The name Čistá means literally "clean, clear". The name refers to the time when the village was cleansed from paying taxes after its foundation. It was a reward to the settlers for settling a new area and protecting a trade route.

Geography
It lies in the Jizera Table.

History
The first written mention of Čistá is in a deed of King Charles IV from 1351. In 1625, the village was acquired by Albrecht von Wallenstein, who annexed it to the Frýdlant estate.

Sights
The landmark of Čistá is the Church of Saint Lawrence. It is a Neoclassical church, which was built in 1697–1700 and reconstructed in 1897.

References

External links

Villages in Mladá Boleslav District